"Take Me To Your Heart" is a 1988 song recorded by Rick Astley. Written and produced by Stock Aitken Waterman, the song was released the same year as the second single from the album, Hold Me in Your Arms. It was a success on the UK Singles Chart where it peaked at number 8 and charted for eleven weeks. It was also a top 10 hit in Denmark, Germany, Greece, Ireland and Spain. Unlike most of Astley's previous singles, it was never released in the U.S.

Plot track controversy
A small amount of controversy was raised around the synthesiser programming similarities of  "Big Fun", the hit single recorded by American band Inner City, and Astley's "Take Me to Your Heart". Writer and producer Matt Aitken has confirmed the Astley track was inspired by the Inner City song, but added that "you can't copyright a synth pattern," and claimed, "we wrote a better song [than Inner City] did".

Track listings 
7" single
 "Take Me to Your Heart" – 3:27
 "I'll Be Fine" – 3:44

12" maxi
 "Take Me to Your Heart" (Autumn Leaves Mix) – 6:38
 "I'll Be Fine" – 3:44
 "Take Me to Your Heart" (Instrumental) – 3:27

CD maxi – Germany
 "Take Me to Your Heart" (The Dick Dastardly Mix) – 6:55
 "I'll Be Fine" – 3:44
 "Rick's Hit Mix" – 5:48

12" maxi – Germany
 "Take Me to Your Heart" (The Dick Dastardly Mix) – 6:55
 "R.A. House Megamix" (mixed by Wild Boy) – 14:35

Personnel 
 Rick Astley – lead and backing vocals 
 Matt Aitken – keyboards, guitars 
 Mike Stock – keyboards, backing vocals 
 George De Angelis – additional keyboards 
 A. Linn – drums 
 Shirley Lewis – backing vocals 
 Mae McKenna – backing vocals 
 Leroy Osborne – backing vocals

Versions
"Take Me to Your Heart" (7" Version) – 3:27
"Take Me to Your Heart" (Autumn Leaves Mix) – 6:38
"Take Me to Your Heart" (The Dick Dastardly Mix) – 6:55
"Take Me to Your Heart" (Instrumental) – 3:27

Charts

Weekly charts

Year-end charts

References

1988 singles
Rick Astley songs
Dance-pop songs
Song recordings produced by Stock Aitken Waterman
Songs written by Mike Stock (musician)
Songs written by Matt Aitken
Songs written by Pete Waterman
1988 songs
RCA Records singles